BarentsWatch was launched in May-2012 by Norwegian Minister of Foreign Affairs Jonas Gahr Støre and Norwegian Minister of Fisheries and Coastal Affairs Lisbeth Berg-Hansen. The information portal provides an overview of activity and knowledge in coastal and sea areas. The system covers sea and coastal areas from Denmark in the south, to Greenland in the west, the North Pole in the north and Novaja Semlja in the east.

The establishment of the BarentsWatch information system is based on cooperation between 27 Norwegian state agencies and research institutes. The Norwegian government decided in June 2010 that their ocean management and information system BarentsWatch should be placed in Tromsø. The system integration was delivered by Kongsberg Spacetec.

Partners
 Bioforsk
 Center for International Climate and Environmental Research-Oslo (CICERO)
 Norwegian Meteorological Institute
 Norut
 Norwegian Armed Forces
 Norwegian Defence Research Establishment
 Norwegian Polar Institute
 Norwegian Directorate for Nature Management
 Norwegian Mapping and Cadastre Authority
 Norwegian Climate and Pollution Agency
 Norwegian Institute of Marine Research
 Norwegian Institute for Air Research
 Norwegian Customs 
 University of Tromsø
 Norwegian Space Centre
 National Police Directorate (Norway)
 Directorate for Civil Protection and Emergency Planning
 Joint Rescue Coordination Centre of Southern Norway
 University Centre in Svalbard

References

External links
 Official website
 English brochure about Barentswatch

Government agencies of Norway
Government agencies established in 2011
2011 establishments in Norway
Organisations based in Tromsø